The Battle of Buçaco or Bussaco, fought on 27 September 1810 during the Peninsular War in the Portuguese mountain range of Serra do Buçaco, resulted in the defeat of French forces by Lord Wellington's Anglo-Portuguese Army.

Masséna was uncertain as to the disposition and strength of the opposing forces because Wellington deployed them on the reverse slope of the ridge, where they could neither be easily seen nor easily softened up with artillery. The actual assaults were delivered by the corps of Marshal Michel Ney and General of Division (Major General) Jean Reynier, but after much fierce fighting they failed to dislodge the allied forces and were driven off after having lost 4,500 men against 1,250 Anglo-Portuguese casualties. However, Wellington was ultimately forced to withdraw to the 
Lines of Torres Vedras after his positions were outflanked by Masséna's troops.

Background 

The Third Portuguese campaign had started with the construction of the Lines of Torres Vedras and the Siege of Ciudad Rodrigo.

Operations
In 1810, Emperor Napoleon I ordered Masséna to drive the British from Portugal. Accordingly, the French marshal began the Siege of Ciudad Rodrigo in April. The Spanish garrison held out until 9 July when the fortress fell. The Battle of the Côa was fought soon after. The Siege of Almeida ended suddenly with a massive explosion of the fortress magazine on 26 August. With all obstacles cleared from their path, the French could march on Lisbon in strength.

It was important to delay the French until the defences being built around Lisbon, the Lines of Torres Vedras, could be completed. Using selective demolition of bridges and roads, Viscount Wellington restricted the choice of routes the French could use and slowed the advance of the French troops. At the end of September, they met Wellington's army drawn up on the ridge of Bussaco.

The ridge, which at its highest rises to 549 metres, lies at right angles to the main road to Coimbra and thence to Lisbon, providing one of the few and certainly the best defensive position on the French route of march.

Allied organisation

Wellington had brought together six British infantry divisions:
 the Light under Brigadier General (Brig Gen) Robert Craufurd
 the 1st led by Major General (Maj Gen) Brent Spencer
 the 2nd commanded by Maj Gen Rowland Hill
 the 3rd under Maj Gen Thomas Picton, with attached Portuguese brigade
 the 4th led by Maj Gen Lowry Cole, with attached Portuguese brigade
 the 5th under Maj Gen James Leith, with attached Portuguese brigade
In addition, the newly re-trained (by the British under the direction of Lieutenant General William Carr Beresford) Portuguese Army supplied a two-brigade Portuguese infantry division under Maj Gen John Hamilton, and three independent Portuguese brigades led by Brig Gen Denis Pack, Brig Gen Alexander Campbell and Brig Gen John Coleman.

Brig Gen George De Grey, Brig Gen John Slade, Brig Gen George Anson and Brig Gen Henry Fane led four British cavalry brigades, plus four regiments of Portuguese cavalry. In batteries of six guns apiece, there were six British (Ross RHA, Bull RHA, Thompson, Lawson, two unknown), two King's German Legion (Rettberg, Cleeves) and five Portuguese (Rozierres, Da Cunha Preto, Da Silva, Freira, Sousa) batteries under Brig Gen Edward Howorth.

The Anglo Portuguese army numbered 50,000, with 50% Portuguese troops.

French organisation
Masséna's army of 60,000 included the II Corps under Reynier, the VI Corps led by Ney, the VIII Corps under MG Jean Andoche Junot and a cavalry reserve led by MG Louis Pierre, Count Montbrun. The divisions of MG Pierre Hugues Victoire Merle and MG Étienne Heudelet de Bierre made up Reynier's corps. Ney's corps had three divisions under MGs Jean Marchand, Julien Mermet and Louis Loison. Junot had the divisions of MG Bertrand Clausel and MG Jean-Baptiste Solignac. Each French corps contained the standard brigade of light cavalry. General of Brigade (BG) Jean Baptiste Eblé, Masséna's artillery chief, commanded 112 guns.

Plans

Wellington posted his army along the crest of Bussaco Ridge, facing east. To improve his lateral communications, he had previously ordered his four officers from the Royal Corps of Engineers to cut a road that ran the length of the ridge on the reverse slope. Cole held the left (north) flank. Next came Craufurd, Spencer, Picton and Leith. Hill held the right (south) flank with Hamilton's men attached.

Masséna, believing he easily outnumbered the British and goaded by Ney and other officers to attack the British position rather than go around it, ordered a reconnaissance of the steep ridge. Very few of Wellington's troops were visible, as they remained on the reverse slope and were ordered not to light cooking fires. The French General planned to send Reynier at the centre of the ridge, which he believed to be the British right flank. Once the II Corps attack showed some signs of success, Masséna would launch Ney's corps at the British along the main road. The VIII Corps stood behind the VI Corps in reserve. While Ney announced that he was ready to attack and conquer, Reynier suddenly had second thoughts, predicting his attack would be beaten.

Battle

II Corps attack
Reynier's troops struck in the early morning mist. Heudelet sent his leading brigade straight up the slope in a formation one company wide and eight battalions deep. When the leading regiment reached the top of the ridge, they found themselves facing the 74th Foot and two Portuguese battalions in line, plus 12 cannon. The French tried to change formation from column into a line. Pelet says, "The column began to deploy as if at an exercise." But the Allies brought intense musketry to bear. Soon, the French infantrymen were thrown into confusion. However, they clung to a precarious toehold on the ridge.

Several hundred yards to the north, Merle's division thrust up the ridge in a similar formation. Picton hurriedly massed his defenders by using the ridgetop road. Met at the crest by the 88th Foot and the 45th Foot and two Portuguese battalions in a concave line, the French tried unsuccessfully to deploy into line. Crushed by converging fire, the French fled down the slope. Merle was wounded while General of Brigade Jean François Graindorge fell mortally wounded. Wellington rode up to Colonel Alexander Wallace of the 88th and remarked, "Wallace, I have never witnessed a more gallant charge."

Seeing Heudelet's second brigade standing immobile at the foot of the ridge, Reynier rode up to BG Maximilien Foy and demanded an immediate attack. With the Allies out of position after defeating the first two attacks, Foy hit a weak spot in their defences. Fortuitously, the French struck the least prepared unit in the Allied army—a Portuguese militia unit—and routed it. But the morning mist cleared, revealing no enemies in front of the British right flank. Wellington had already ordered Leith to shift his men to the north to assist Picton. Before Foy's men could consolidate their gain, they were attacked by the 9th Foot and 38th Foot of Leith and some of Picton's men. The French were swept off the ridge and Foy wounded. After seeing this rout, Heudelet's other brigade withdrew to the base of the ridge.

VI Corps attack
Hearing gunfire, Ney assumed Reynier's men were enjoying success and ordered an attack. In this sector, the main highway climbed a long spur past the hamlets of Moura and Sula to reach the crest at the Convent of Bussaco. Against a very heavy British skirmish line, Loison's division fought its way forward. Near the crest, 1,800 men of the 43rd and 52nd infantry regiments lay down waiting. As Loison's leading brigade approached the convent grounds, the two British units stood up, fired a terrific volley at point blank range and charged with the bayonet. The French brigade collapsed and fled leaving BG Édouard Simon, their commander, wounded and a prisoner.

A short time later and slightly further south, Loison's second brigade under BG Claude François Ferey ran into a close-range fire from two batteries plus Anglo-Portuguese musketry. This unit was also routed. A final thrust by BG Antoine Louis Popon de Maucune's brigade of Marchand's division met defeat when it ran into Denis Pack's Portuguese brigade. The two sides occupied the rest of the day in vigorous skirmishing, but the French did not try to attack in force again.

Aftermath 

The French suffered 522 dead, 3,612 wounded, and 364 captured. The Allied losses numbered 200 dead, 1,001 wounded, and 51 missing. The British and Portuguese each lost exactly 626 men.

Masséna now realised the size of Wellington's forces and the strength of his defensive position, so that afternoon ordered troops to move off to the right on a hazardous but skilful move to outflank the position, reaching another road to the north just ahead of a Portuguese Corps that had been sent there to defend it.

Wellington, after spending the night in the convent, and finding his position turned, resumed the leisurely retreat of his army towards the, still being constructed, Lines of Torres Vedras. He reached these in good order by 10 October.

Continuing to advance, Masséna had left his sick and wounded troops at Coimbra, where a few days later, they fell into the hands of the Portuguese.

This was the first major battle of the Peninsular War in which units of the reconstituted Portuguese Army fought, where the Portuguese troops played a prominent part and the victory served as a great morale boost to the inexperienced troops.

The Third Portuguese campaign proceeded with the probing of the Lines in the Battle of Sobral on 14 October. Masséna found them too strong to attack and withdrew into winter quarters. Deprived of food for his men and harried by Anglo-Portuguese hit-and-run tactics, he lost a further 25,000 men captured or dead from starvation or sickness before he retreated into Spain early in 1811. This finally freed Portugal from French occupation except for the fortress of Almeida, near the frontier. During the retreat, several actions were fought, including the Battle of Sabugal.

Notes

References

Further reading

In fiction
 Under Wellington's Command by G.A. Henty includes a section on the Battle of Bussaco (sp. 'Busaco' in the text).
 Sharpe's Escape by Bernard Cornwell covers the battle.
 Stranger from the Sea by Winston Graham features a visit to the front line by Ross Poldark, who is on a government fact-finding mission.

External links
 Military Museum of Bussaco
 

Battle of Bussaco
Battles of the Peninsular War
Battles involving the United Kingdom
Battles involving Portugal
Battles involving France
Battle of Bussaco
King's German Legion
Battle honours of the King's Royal Rifle Corps
September 1810 events
Arthur Wellesley, 1st Duke of Wellington